MOT's life skills concept has five programmes which are offered to schools and municipalities on four continents – Europe, Africa, Asia and America.

MOT originates from Norway. The initiative to start MOT was taken by the former Olympians and Norwegian speedskaters Atle Vårvik and Johann Olav Koss after the Olympic Winter Games in 1994. MOT was founded to prevent crime and social society problems.

MOT's life skills concept is founded on the purpose to create a safer society through strengthening youth's robustness, awareness, and courage – the courage to live, courage to care, and courage to say no. The MOT Concept is offered to schools, municipalities, and countries on a partnership premise.

MOT is operating in five countries: Norway, South Africa, Denmark, Thailand, and Latvia.

Results 
Evaluations show that MOT prevents and protects against the most negative outcomes of the youth's time. There is less bullying, fewer youths without one single friend, fewer mental health problems, and substance use disorders in MOT schools.

External links
Official site (Norwegian)

MOT
MOT
Addiction and substance abuse organizations
Mental health organisations in Norway